"This Is the Last Time" is a song performed and composed by British rock band Keane, released on 22 November 2004 as the fourth commercial single from their debut album, Hopes and Fears (2004). It was first released with Fierce Panda Records on 13 October 2003 and later in 2004 as a different version with Island Records. It was released as track two of the international version, but track nine on the British version. The single reached number 18 on the UK chart in November 2004.

Fierce Panda single
The Fierce Panda version was the first Keane record released outside the UK and one of the few singles available in the United States. The single sold around 4,000 copies and is stated to have charted at number 58; however, this was ineligible for the chart due to the hyperlink the record contained. It was the only record ever co-released with White Light Records, Keane's own label, which soon disappeared since there was already a company with that name.

Island single

A year after signing with Island Records, a reissue of the song was released on 22 November 2004. This reissue featured all-new B-sides and cover, as well as a reworked version of the single and its music video. Additionally, a DVD was released featuring a cover showing a deer instead of the bull used on the single cover. This newer release includes a 2003 demo of the song featuring Rice-Oxley on lead vocals.

Composition and meaning
Tim Rice-Oxley composed this song circa 2001. It was one of the first songs played without Dominic Scott, ex-guitarist of the band, being possibly about him. It was recorded at Les Essarts, Normandy, France, during the James Sanger sessions from August to November 2001. A newer version was recorded at the Helioscentric Studios in Rye, East Sussex.

The song means regret, confusion and separating, commented by Rice-Oxley:

Music videos
The first music video for "This Is the Last Time" was used only during gigs as a live visual. This first video featured a baby in a pushchair, graffiti on the walls and pink trees without leaves.
The next two different videos were released for British and American markets, with the Fierce Panda single in 2003. The second video clip shows several trees under a pink sky and rain falling down. 
Island Records used this idea to shoot a third video with a similar background but this time Keane appearing on it.

The fourth and final video was directed by Howard Greenhaigh from Exposure Films and shot between 4 and 5 October 2004.
The video starts with Keane playing in the middle of the street. Then, Chaplin starts walking with his microphone. He realizes the cable of the microphone can't go farther so he changes his microphone for a taxicab radio. He continues walking with the radio and again he can't go on because of the cable. Finally Chaplin sees a music store, gets another microphone and then breaks the window. The band are now playing inside the store and now there's also a crowd watching them.

B-sides
"Can't Stop Now"

For more information about this song, visit "Can't Stop Now".

"Allemande"

Only available on the Fierce Panda CD. Rice-Oxley explained to some fans the title is inspired by a family of pianos called Allemande. "Allemande" was played live a few times during 2004. It also appeared on the EP Live Recordings 2004, on the Japanese version of Hopes and Fears and on the "Bend and Break" single.

"She Opens Her Eyes"
 Echoes
 Piano (Yamaha CP70)
 Vocals (by Tom Chaplin)

"This Is the Last Time" (demo)

Tim Rice-Oxley is the lead vocalist in this no-drums driven demo of the single.

Track listings
Fierce Panda CD single
(NING147CD)
 "This Is the Last Time" – 3:31
 "Can't Stop Now" – 3:40
 "Allemande" – 4:22

Island CD single
(CID880)
 "This Is the Last Time"
 "She Opens Her Eyes"
 "This Is the Last Time" (demo)
 "This Is the Last Time" (video)

Island Limited Edition DVD
(CIDV880)
 "Somewhere Only You Know" (secret gig)
 "We Might as Well Be Strangers" (live; Villiers Theatre, London 5 February 2004)
 "This Is the Last Time" (live; Irving Plaza New York City 29 September 2004)
 Photo gallery – "This Is the Last Time" video.

UK 7-inch vinyl
(IS880)
 "This Is the Last Time"
 "She Opens Her Eyes"

Island alternative versions
Netherlands
 "This Is the Last Time"
 "She Opens Her Eyes"

France, 2CD

CD1
 "This Is the Last Time"
 "She Opens Her Eyes"
 "This Is the Last Time" (demo)
 "This Is the Last Time" (video)

CD2
 "This Is the Last Time"
 "Everybody's Changing" (live; Airwaves Festival, Reykjavík 23 October 2004)

Charts

Weekly charts

Year-end charts

Certifications

References

2003 singles
2003 songs
2004 singles
Fierce Panda Records singles
Island Records singles
Keane (band) songs
Music videos directed by Howard Greenhalgh
Songs written by James Sanger
Songs written by Richard Hughes (musician)
Songs written by Tim Rice-Oxley
Songs written by Tom Chaplin